Els Plans de Sió is a municipality in the province of Lleida and autonomous community of Catalonia, Spain.

References

External links

 Government data pages 

Municipalities in Segarra